Dream Big is Ryan Shupe & The RubberBand's third album, independently released in 2003 under the title Hey Hey Hey.  It featured four tracks that had debuted on the band's first two albums but re-recorded as well as eight brand new songs. A similar track listing became available as the band's major label debut under the title "Dream Big" when the band signed a record deal with Capitol Nashville. Dream Big is missing the track "She's Bad For Me" and does not contain the hidden track "Corn Dogs" from Hey Hey Hey. "Corn Dogs" has since been officially released as the closing track on the band's album Last Man Standing.

The song "Dream Big", the band's only chart single, was also featured in advertisements for the NBC reality show Three Wishes, which was hosted by Amy Grant.

Dream Big track listing
All songs written by Ryan Shupe.
 "Banjo Boy" (03:31)
 "Even Superman" (03:35)
 "Dream Big" (03:36)
 "Simplify" (03:26)
 "Would You Love Me" (03:55)
 "Ambush" [Instrumental] (02:46)
 "New Emotion" (03:21)
 "Rain Falls Down" (03:53)
 "Never Give Up" (03:01)
 "Oh How I Miss You" (03:12)
 "Hey Hey Hey" (02:11)

Hey Hey Hey track listing
 "Banjo Boy" (03:29)
 "Even Superman" (03:37)
 "Dream Big" (03:36)
 "Simplify" (03:28)
 "Would You Love Me" (03:55)
 "Ambush" (02:47)
 "New Emotion" (03:23)
 "Rain Falls Down" (03:43)
 "Never Give Up" (03:03)
 "She's Bad For Me" (03:16)
 "Oh How I Miss You" (03:14)
 "Hey Hey Hey" (02:12)
features the hidden track "Corn Dogs"

Chart performance

Personnel (Dream Big)

Ryan Shupe & the RubberBand
 Ryan Shupe — fiddle, mandolin, lead vocals
 Craig Miner — banjo, mandolin, bouzouki, Dobro, vocals
 Roger Archbald — guitar, vocals
 Colin Botts — bass, Hammond B3, pandeiro, vocals
 Bart Olson — drums, percussion, vocals

Additional musicians
 Nathan Botts — trumpet, piccolo trumpet
 David Halliday — tenor saxophone
 Silvo Richetto — programming

References

2003 albums
2005 albums
Capitol Records albums
Ryan Shupe & the RubberBand albums